Tashly-Sharipovo (Taşlı-Şärip) is a rural locality (a selo) in Imay-Karmalinsky Selsoviet, Davlekanovsky District, Bashkortostan, Russia. The population was 344 as of 2010. There are 6 streets.

Geography 
Tashly-Sharipovo is located 24 km east of Davlekanovo (the district's administrative centre) by road. Tashlytamak is the nearest rural locality.

References 

Rural localities in Davlekanovsky District